Crowfield Windmill is a smock mill at Crowfield, Suffolk, England which has been conserved.

History

Crowfield Windmill was originally built as a drainage mill near Great Yarmouth. It was moved to Crowfield c1840 and converted to a corn mill. The mill worked by wind until 1916 when the cap was blown off. An auxiliary engine was used to power the millstones until the mid-1930s.

Description

Crowfield Windmill is a three-storey smock mill on a single-storey brick base. It had four patent sails and the boat-shaped cap was winded by a fantail. It has two pairs of underdrift millstones which are mounted on a hurst frame.

Millers

Gibbons - 1930s
Reference for above:-

References

Windmills completed in 1840
Towers completed in the 19th century
Windmills in Suffolk
Smock mills in England
Grinding mills in the United Kingdom
Octagonal buildings in the United Kingdom